The 1977–78 Cal State Fullerton Titans men's basketball team represented California State University, Fullerton during the 1977–78 NCAA Division I men's basketball season. The Titans, led by head coach Bobby Dye, played their home games at the Titan Gym, in Fullerton, California, as members of the Pacific Coast Athletic Association. They finished the season 23–9, 9–5 in PCAA play to finish in third place. In the championship game of the PCAA tournament, they defeated Long Beach State to win the tournament and receive an at-large bid to the NCAA tournament – the school’s first appearance in the NCAA Tournament. As the No. 4 at-large (4L) seed in the West region, they upset New Mexico and San Francisco to reach the regional final. Despite a valiant effort, the Titans fell to Arkansas in the Elite Eight.

Roster

Schedule and results

|-
!colspan=9 style=| Non-conference regular season

|-
!colspan=9 style=| PCAA regular season

|-
!colspan=9 style=| PCAA tournament

|-
!colspan=9 style=| NCAA tournament

Source:

References

Cal State Fullerton Titans men's basketball seasons
Cal State Fullerton
Cal State Fullerton Titans men's basketball
Cal State Fullerton Titans men's basketball
Cal State Fullerton